Hugh Alexander Law (28 July 1872 – 2 April 1943) was an Irish nationalist politician. He represented constituencies in County Donegal as a Member of Parliament (MP) in the British House of Commons and later as a Teachta Dála (TD) in Dáil Éireann.

A barrister, he was the second son of Hugh Law, who had been Lord Chancellor of Ireland from 1881 to 1883, and his wife Helen White, and was educated in England at Rugby School and University College, Oxford. 

He was returned as an Irish Parliamentary Party member of the Westminster parliament for West Donegal at an unopposed by-election in April 1902, and was unopposed at successive general elections until he stood down at the 1918 general election, when the seat was won by Joseph Sweeney of Sinn Féin.

A supporter of the pro-war policy of John Redmond during World War I, he held a number of administrative positions in London: in the secretariat of the Ministry of Munitions (1915–1916), the news department of the Foreign Office (1916–1918), and the advisory council of the Ministry of Reconstruction (1918).

At the 1923 Irish general election he was an unsuccessful Farmers' Party candidate for the 5th Dáil in the Donegal constituency.  He stood again as a Cumann na nGaedheal candidate at the June 1927 general election and was elected to the 6th Dáil. Law was re-elected at the September 1927 general election, but lost his seat at the 1932 general election, and did not stand again.

References

External links

1872 births
1943 deaths
Irish barristers
Irish Parliamentary Party MPs
Members of the Parliament of the United Kingdom for County Donegal constituencies (1801–1922)
People educated at Rugby School
UK MPs 1900–1906
UK MPs 1906–1910
UK MPs 1910
UK MPs 1910–1918
Cumann na nGaedheal TDs
Members of the 5th Dáil
Members of the 6th Dáil
Alumni of University College, Oxford